The flag of the Federated States of Micronesia was adopted on 30 November 1978. The blue field represents the Pacific Ocean. In an echo of U.S. heraldic practice, the stars represent the four federated states: Chuuk, Pohnpei, Kosrae and Yap, arranged like the points of the compass.

History
The Trust Territory of the Pacific Islands was administered by the United States under the auspices of the United Nations after World War II. In the 1950s, the residents had protested the adoption of a flag, citing the lack of a cohesive identity for the disparate group of islands, and the scheme was dropped. 

The trust territory first adopted a flag on 24 October 1962, which featured a design of six white stars around a shade of blue based on the flag of the United Nations. The flag was designed by Gonzalo Santos and officially approved in 1965 by the National Congress. The six stars represented the districts of Yap, Truk, Pohnpei, Palau, Marshall Islands, and Northern Mariana Islands; the latter three did not become part of the eventual Federated States of Micronesia (FSM) in 1979. 

A four-star variation of the former trust territory flag was adopted on 30 November 1978 prior to independence; Kosrae was split from Pohnpei and is represented by the fourth star. The blue shade based on the United Nations flag was substituted for a darker blue after the FSM ascended to the Compact of Free Association with the United States on 3 November 1986.

Design
The four white stars are oriented in a circle with none of the "rays" pointing inwards, adorning a shade of blue representing the Pacific Ocean. The ratio of the flag is 10:19 and the width of each star to the flag is 1:5, though it is permissible to reproduce the flag in other dimensions for unofficial purposes.

Historical flags

State flags

References

Flags introduced in 1978
National flags
Flag